No. 206 Squadron is a Test and Evaluation Squadron of the Royal Air Force. Until 2005 it was employed in the maritime patrol role with the Nimrod MR.2 at RAF Kinloss, Moray. It was announced in December 2004 that 206 Squadron would disband on 1 April 2005, with half of its crews being redistributed to Nos. 120 and 201 Squadrons, also stationed at Kinloss. This was a part of the UK Defence Review called Delivering Security in a Changing World; the Nimrod MR.2 fleet was reduced in number from 21 to 16 as a consequence.

History

Formation and early years
No. 206 Squadron was formed on 31 December 1916 as No. 6 Squadron, Royal Naval Air Service, a fighter unit operating Nieuport 17s and later Sopwith Camels over the Western Front before disbanding on 27 August 1917. The squadron was reformed on 1 January 1918 as a bomber and reconnaissance unit, operating Airco DH9s. With the establishment of the RAF in 1918 the squadron was renumbered No. 206 Squadron, RAF, being used for photo-reconnaissance in support of the British Second Army and for bombing support during the Allies final offensive. Following the Armistice it was used to operate an air mail service for the British occupying army in Germany, before being deployed to Helwan, Egypt in June 1919. It was renumbered as 47 Squadron on 1 February 1920.

Flying ace Major (later Group Captain) Ernest Norton served in the squadron during World War I.

Interbellum and World War II

The squadron was reformed at RAF Manston from a flight of No. 48 Squadron on 15 June 1936, with Avro Ansons as part of the new RAF Coastal Command. It moved to RAF Bircham Newton on 30 July that year. It initially operated as a training squadron, but later assigned to maritime patrols.

On the outbreak of the Second World War, the Squadron entered into a routine of patrols with its Ansons from Bircham Newton with detachments at other bases around the United Kingdom, including RAF Carew Cheriton in South Wales and RAF Hooton Park on the Mersey. The squadron attacked German submarines on two occasions in September, with no effect (the  anti-submarine bombs used by the RAF at the time were ineffective weapons - one friendly-fire incident in December 1939 resulted in a direct hit on the conning tower of the British submarine HMS Snapper with the sole damage being four broken light bulbs).  The squadron's Ansons also occasionally encountered German maritime reconnaissance aircraft. On 8 November, one shot down a Heinkel He 115 floatplane. On the same day, a different Anson engaged and hit two Dornier Do 18, probably shooting one down.

In March 1940, the squadron began to re-equip with the Lockheed Hudson, flying the first patrols using the new aircraft on 12 April.  It converted to the Boeing Fortress Mk.II in July 1942, allowing long range patrols over the Atlantic, moving to the Azores during October 1943, before returning to the United Kingdom for re-equipping with the Consolidated Liberator Mk.VI, later augmented by the Liberators Mk.VIII. The Squadron's Liberators were based at RAF St Eval until after D-Day, when the unit moved North to RAF Leuchars. A section was detached to West Africa for anti-submarine and convoy patrols as No. 200 Squadron RAF. Detachments also operated from bases such as RAF St Eval in Cornwall and RAF Aldergrove in County Antrim. The squadron was disbanded on 25 April 1946.

206 Squadron was a successful anti-submarine unit, accounting for nine U-boats destroyed during the Second World War.

Post-war

The squadron was reformed on 17 November 1947, flying Avro York C.1 transport aircraft, but again disbanded on 31 August 1949. It was soon reformed on 1 December 1949, flying Douglas Dakotas, the military transport version of the well-known Douglas DC-3 airliner. This lasted only till 20 February 1950 however.

Reformed yet again on 27 September 1952 as a maritime reconnaissance squadron, it was equipped with Avro Shackletons and based at RAF St Eval in Cornwall. The squadron moved to RAF Kinloss in Scotland in July 1965 and was re-equipped with the jet-powered Hawker-Siddeley Nimrod in November 1970. It continued to operate the Nimrod until disbanding on 1 April 2005.

Present
On 1 April 2009, the Heavy Aircraft Test & Evaluation Squadron at Boscombe Down (Air Space Warfare Centre) gained the 206 Squadron numberplate, as 206 (Reserve) Squadron. Currently split between RAF Boscombe Down and RAF Brize Norton with 'B Flt' C130 specialists moved from RAF Lyneham in June 2011 to their new home at RAF Brize Norton in Oxfordshire to continue the Hercules Test and Evaluation process.

Aircraft operated

See also
 List of Royal Air Force aircraft squadrons

References

Bibliography 

 Ashworth, Chris. Encyclopedia of Modern Royal Air Force Squadrons. Wellingborough, UK: Patrick Stevens Limited, 1989. .
 Bowyer, Michael J.F and John D.R. Rawlings. Squadron Codes, 1937–56. Cambridge, Cambridgeshire, UK: Patrick Stephens Ltd., 1979. .
 Flintham, Vic and Andrew Thomas. Combat Codes: A Full Explanation and Listing of British, Commonwealth and Allied Air Force Unit Codes Since 1938. Shrewsbury, Shropshire, UK: Airlife Publishing Ltd., 2003. .
 Franks, Norman. Nieuport Aces of World War I. Osprey Publishing, 2000. , .
 Halley, James J. Famous Maritime Squadrons of the RAF, Volume 1. Windsor, Berkshire, UK: Hylton Lacy Publishers Ltd., 1973. .
 Halley, James J. The Squadrons of the Royal Air Force & Commonwealth, 1918–1988. Tonbridge, Kent, UK: Air-Britain (Historians) Ltd., 1988. .
 Jefford, C.G. RAF Squadrons, a Comprehensive Record of the Movement and Equipment of all RAF Squadrons and their Antecedents since 1912. Shrewsbury, Shropshire, UK: Airlife Publishing Ltd., 2001. .
 Lewis, Peter. Squadron Histories: R.F.C, R.N.A.S and R.A.F., 1912–59. London: Putnam, 1959.
 Moyes, Philip J.R. Bomber Squadrons of the RAF and their Aircraft. London: Macdonald and Jane's (Publishers) Ltd., 1964 (new edition 1976). .
 Neistle, Axel. German U-Boat Losses during World War II (1998) Greenhill Books. 
 Rawlings, John D.R. Coastal, Support and Special Squadrons of the RAF and their Aircraft. London: Jane's Publishing Company Ltd., 1982. .
 Rawlings, John D.R. Fighter Squadrons of the RAF and their Aircraft. London: Macdonald and Jane's (Publishers) Ltd., 1969 (new edition 1976, reprinted 1978). .
 Westrop, Mike. History of no. 6 Squadron Royal Naval Air Service in World War I. Atglen, Pennsylvania; Schiffer Publishing, 2006. .

External links

 No. 206 Squadron
 No. 206 Squadron Coastal Command deployments
 RAF Davidstow Moor

Military units and formations established in 1916
206 Squadron
06 Squadron
Military units and formations of the United Kingdom in the Falklands War
1916 establishments in the United Kingdom